SuperPin is the name given to any of the widebody pinball games released by Williams and Midway (under the Bally name) between 1993 and late-1994.

Aside from the widebody playfield (being almost as wide as the backbox of the machine), these games often include extra gimmicks and toys which would add to the gameplay (e.g., the gumball machine in Twilight Zone, the dual Phasers in Star Trek: The Next Generation or the dual gamemode playfield of Judge Dredd). All of the SuperPins use the DCS Sound System, except for Twilight Zone.

Games
There were seven games released under the SuperPin label:

The Twilight Zone (Midway; designed by Pat Lawlor, released April 1993)
Indiana Jones: The Pinball Adventure (Williams; designed by Mark Ritchie, released August 1993)
Judge Dredd (Midway; designed by John Trudeau, released September 1993)
Star Trek: The Next Generation (Williams; designed by Steve Ritchie, released November 1993)
Popeye Saves the Earth (Midway; designed by Python Anghelo and Barry Oursler, released January 1994)
Demolition Man (Williams; designed by Dennis Nordman, released April 1994)
Red & Ted's Road Show (Williams; designed by Pat Lawlor, released October 1994)

WMS Industries
Pinball platforms